Homoisocitric acid  is an isomer of homocitric acid in which the hydroxyl is on the 2 position. It is an intermediate in the α-aminoadipate pathway of lysine biosynthesis where it is produced by homocitrate synthase and is a substrate for homoaconitase.

Homoisocitrate is an anion, salt, or ester of homoisocitric acid.

See also
 Homoaconitic acid
 Adipic acid

References

Tricarboxylic acids
Alpha hydroxy acids